Marino Bollini (25 February 1933 – 10 January 2020) served as Captain-Regent of San Marino multiple times.

Career 
He first served from 1 April 1979 to 1 October 1979 alongside Lino Celli. He served alongside Giuseppe Amici from 1 October 1984 to 1 April 1985. From 1 April 1995 to 1 October 1995, he served alongside Settimio Lonfernini. From 1 October 1999 to 1 April 2000, he served alongside Giuseppe Arzilli. He was a member of the Sammarinese Socialist Party until 2005, when he joined the Party of Socialists and Democrats.

Personal life 
Marino Bollini died on 10 January 2020, at the age of 86.

References

1933 births
2020 deaths
Captains Regent of San Marino
Members of the Grand and General Council
Sammarinese Socialist Party politicians